Cornelia James may refer to :
Cornelia James (11 March 1917 – 10 December 1999): British glovemaker and businesswoman of Austrian origin, and the founder of the firm of glovemakers that bears her name.
Cornelia James: British firm of glovemakers, founded in 1946, and with a Royal Warrant since 1979.
Cornelia James Cannon  (1876–1969): Feminist reformer and best-selling author of the novel Red Rust.